Lilius is a surname. Notable people with the surname include:
 Lilius family
 Aloysius Lilius (c. 1510–1576) principal author of the Gregorian Calendar
 Lilius (crater), named after him
 Franciszek Lilius (c. 1600–1657), Polish composer
 Henrik Lilius (1683–1745), Finnish poet
 Johan Lilius (1724–1803),  Justice of the Hovrätt and founding member, with Henrik Gabriel Porthan, of the Aurora Society.
Frans Hugo Lilius (1860–1936), Finnish senator, Minister of Justice
Frans Oskar Lilius (1871–1928), Finnish senator.
 Albert Lilius (1873–1947), Finnish professor of psychology at Helsinki University, pioneer in developmental psychology.
 Aleko Lilius (1890–1977), Finnish adventurer and author.
 Carl-Gustaf Lilius (1928–1998), Finnish painter, sculptor and author
 Irmelin Sandman Lilius (1936–), Finnish Swedes author
 Henrik Lilius, (1939–) professor of art history at Helsinki University, professor of architectural history at Helsinki University of Technology, and former head of The National Board of Antiquities
Mikael Lilius (born 1949), Finnish businessman